Zinky Cohn (August 18, 1908, Oakland, California – April 26, 1952, Chicago) was an American jazz pianist.

Cohn played in Chicago in the late 1920s, including in Jimmie Noone's Apex Club Orchestra (1928–30); he recorded with Noone extensively between 1929 and 1934, especially for Vocalion Records. Many of the tunes Noone recorded were written and/or arranged by Cohn, including "Apex Blues" (previously attributed to Earl Hines).

Cohn also recorded as a leader in the early 1930s, with a band that featured Leon Washington on tenor saxophone. Cohn recorded with Frankie Franko & His Louisianans in 1930, and also accompanied blues singers such as Georgia White.

Later in the 1930s Cohn led the Chicago musicians' union, and continued to play locally.

References

1908 births
1952 deaths
American jazz pianists
American male pianists
Jazz musicians from California
20th-century American pianists
20th-century American male musicians
American male jazz musicians